Radio Classica is an Italian radio station operated by Italian publishing company Class Editori, specialising in Classical music. Programming include news and financial reports in collaboration with Class News and Class CNBC.

Radio Classica is broadcast locally in the cities of Milan, Como, Lecco and other areas of Lombardy.

External links
 Official site

Free-to-air
Radio stations in Italy
Mass media in Milan
Classical music radio stations
Radio stations established in 2001
Class Editori